Richard Ferdinand Maximilian Ignatius Joseph Valentin Hubertus Maria Graf von Schaesberg-Tannheim (January 7, 1884 in Tannheim – September 20, 1953 in Surenburg, Hörstel) was a German Graf and horse rider who competed in the 1912 Summer Olympics. He was part of the German team, which was able to win the silver medal in the equestrian team event.

References

External links
profile

1884 births
1953 deaths
German royalty
Equestrians at the 1912 Summer Olympics
Olympic equestrians of Germany
German male equestrians
Olympic silver medalists for Germany
German event riders
Olympic medalists in equestrian
Medalists at the 1912 Summer Olympics